The 2005 Texas Longhorns baseball team represented the University of Texas in the 2005 NCAA Division I baseball season. The Longhorns played their home games at UFCU Disch-Falk Field. The team was coached by Augie Garrido in his 9th season at Texas.

The Longhorns won the College World Series, defeating the Florida Gators in the championship series.

Roster

Schedule 

! style="background:#BF5700;color:white;"| Regular Season
|- valign="top" 

|- align="center" bgcolor="#ddffdd"
| February 4 ||  || Tony Gwynn Stadium || 7-3 || 1-0 || –
|- align="center" bgcolor="#ddffdd"
| February 5 || San Diego State || Tony Gwynn Stadium || 13-5 || 2–0 || –
|- align="center" bgcolor="#ddffdd"
| February 6 || San Diego State || Tony Gwynn Stadium || 7-0 || 3–0 || –
|- align="center" bgcolor="ddffdd"
| February 9 ||  || Disch-Falk Field || 7-1 || 4–0 || –
|- align="center" bgcolor="#ddffdd"
| February 11 ||  || Disch-Falk Field || 4-3 || 5-0 || –
|- align="center" bgcolor="#ddffdd"
| February 12 || UNLV || Disch-Falk Field || 7-6 || 6-0 || –
|- align="center" bgcolor="#ddffdd"
| February 13 || UNLV || Disch-Falk Field || 12-3 || 7-0 || –
|- align="center" bgcolor="#ddffdd"
| February 15 ||  || Disch-Falk Field || 10-0 || 8-0 || –
|- align="center" bgcolor="ddffdd"
| February 18 ||  || Disch-Falk Field || 5-4 || 9–0 || –
|- align="center" bgcolor="ddffdd"
| February 19 || Stanford || Disch-Falk Field || 8–7 || 10–0 || –
|- align="center" bgcolor="ddffdd"
| February 20 || Stanford || Disch-Falk Field || 5–4 || 11–0 || –
|- align="center" bgcolor="#ddffdd"
| February 22 ||  || Disch-Falk Field || 5-4 || 12-0 || –
|- align="center" bgcolor="#ddffdd"
| February 25 ||  || Disch-Falk Field || 14-0 || 13-0 || –
|- align="center" bgcolor="#ddffdd"
| February 27 || Youngstown State || Disch-Falk Field || 8-0 || 14-0 || –
|- align="center" bgcolor="#ddffdd"
| February 27 || Youngstown State || Disch-Falk Field || 8-2 || 15-0 || –
|-

|- align="center" bgcolor="#ddffdd"
| March 4 || at Arizona || Sancet Stadium || 5-4 || 16-0 || –
|- align="center" bgcolor="ffdddd"
| March 5 || at Arizona || Sancet Stadium || 3-8 || 16-1 || –
|- align="center" bgcolor="#ddffdd"
| March 6 || at Arizona || Sancet Stadium || 5-4 || 17-1 || –
|- align="center" bgcolor="ddffdd"
| March 9 ||  || Disch-Falk Field || 7-0 || 18–1 || –
|- align="center" bgcolor="ddffdd"
| March 11 ||  || Disch-Falk Field || 9-1 || 19–1 || –
|- align="center" bgcolor="ddffdd"
| March 12 || Purdue || Disch-Falk Field || 8-6 || 20–1 || –
|- align="center" bgcolor="ddffdd"
| March 13 || Purdue || Disch-Falk Field || 8-0 || 21–1 || –
|- align="center" bgcolor="ffdddd"
| March 18 || Baylor || Disch-Falk Field || 2-3 || 21-2 || 0-1
|- align="center" bgcolor="ffdddd"
| March 19 || at Baylor || Baylor Ballpark || 1-9 || 21-3 || 0–2
|- align="center" bgcolor="ffdddd"
| March 20 || at Baylor || Baylor Ballpark || 3-4 || 21–4 || 0–3
|- align="center" bgcolor="ddffdd"
| March 24 ||  || Disch-Falk Field || 7-3 || 22-4 || 1-3
|- align="center" bgcolor="ddffdd"
| March 25 || Texas Tech || Disch-Falk Field || 8-7 || 23-4 || 2–3
|- align="center" bgcolor="#ddffdd"
| March 29 ||  || Disch-Falk Field || 2-1 || 24-4 || –
|-

|- align="center" bgcolor="ddffdd"
| April 1 ||  || Disch-Falk Field || 8-0 || 25–4 || 3–3
|- align="center" bgcolor="ddffdd"
| April 2 || Kansas State || Disch-Falk Field || 5-4 || 26–4 || 4–3
|- align="center" bgcolor="ffdddd"
| April 3 || Kansas State || Disch-Falk Field || 3–5 || 26–5 || 4–4
|- align="center" bgcolor="ddffdd"
| April 5 ||   || Disch-Falk Field || 3–2 || 27-5 || –
|- align="center" bgcolor="ffdddd"
| April 8 || at Nebraska || Haymarket Park || 3-4 || 27–6 || 4-5
|- align="center" bgcolor="ddffdd"
| April 9 || at Nebraska || Haymarket Park || 11-4 || 28–6 || 5-5
|- align="center" bgcolor="ddffdd"
| April 10 || at Nebraska || Haymarket Park || 6-5 || 29–6 || 6-5
|- align="center" bgcolor="ddffdd"
| April 15 ||  || Disch-Falk Field || 2-0 || 30–6 || 7–5
|- align="center" bgcolor="ddffdd"
| April 16 || Oklahoma || Disch-Falk Field || 4-0 || 31–6 || 8–5
|- align="center" bgcolor="ddffdd"
| April 17 || Oklahoma || Disch-Falk Field || 11-7 || 32–6 || 9–5
|- align="center" bgcolor="ddffdd"
| April 20 || at Rice || Reckling Park || 7-6 || 33–6 || –
|- align="center" bgcolor="ddffdd"
| April 22 || at  || Allie P. Reynolds Stadium || 4-3 || 34–6 || 10–5
|- align="center" bgcolor="ddffdd"
| April 23 || at Oklahoma State || Allie P. Reynolds Stadium || 12-8 || 35–6 || 11–5
|- align="center" bgcolor="ffdddd"
| April 24 || at Oklahoma State || Allie P. Reynolds Stadium || 2-3 || 35–7 || 11–6
|- align="center" bgcolor="ffdddd"
| April 27 ||   || Disch-Falk Field || 1–2 || 35-8 || –
|- align="center" bgcolor="ddffdd"
| April 29 || Missouri || Disch-Falk Field || 4-1 || 36–8 || 12–6
|- align="center" bgcolor="ffdddd"
| April 30 || Missouri || Disch-Falk Field || 2-7 || 36-9 || 12–7
|-

|- align="center" bgcolor="ddffdd"
| May 1 || Missouri || Disch-Falk Field || 6-1 || 37-9 || 13–7
|- align="center" bgcolor="ddffdd"
| May 3 || Texas-Pan American || Disch-Falk Field || 12-0 || 38–9 || –
|- align="center" bgcolor="ffdddd"
| May 6 || at  || Hoglund Ballpark || 2-5 || 38-10 || 13-8
|- align="center" bgcolor="ffdddd"
| May 7 || at Kansas || Hoglund Ballpark || 1-2 || 38-11 || 13–9
|- align="center" bgcolor="ddffdd"
| April 6 || at Kansas || Hoglund Ballpark || 16–5 || 39–11 || 14–9
|- align="center" bgcolor="ddffdd"
| May 14 ||  || Disch-Falk Field || 9–2 || 40–11 || –
|- align="center" bgcolor="ddffdd"
| May 14 || Dallas Baptist || Disch-Falk Field || 3–2 || 41–11 || –
|- align="center" bgcolor="ffdddd"
| May 20 || at  || Olsen Field || 7–8 || 41–12 || 14–10
|- align="center" bgcolor="ddffdd"
| May 21 || Texas A&M || Disch-Falk Field || 2-1 || 42–12 || 15–10
|- align="center" bgcolor="ddffdd"
| May 22 || Texas A&M || Disch-Falk Field || 11-1 || 43–12 || 16–10
|-

|-
! style="background:#BF5700;color:white;"| Post-Season
|-

|- align="center" bgcolor="ffdddd"
| May 25 || vs. Oklahoma State || Chickasaw Bricktown Ballpark || 4–10 || 43–13
|- align="center" bgcolor="ddffdd"
| May 26 || vs. Kansas || Chickasaw Bricktown Ballpark || 9-0 || 44–13
|- align="center" bgcolor="ddffdd"
| May 27 || vs. Oklahoma State || Chickasaw Bricktown Ballpark || 6-1 || 45–13
|- align="center" bgcolor="ffdddd"
| May 28 || vs. Baylor || Chickasaw Bricktown Ballpark || 8-9 || 45–14
|-

|- align="center" bgcolor="ddffdd"
| June 3 || vs.  || Disch-Falk Field || 20–2 || 46–14
|- align="center" bgcolor="ffdddd"
| June 4 || vs.  || Disch-Falk Field || 2–9 || 46–15
|- align="center" bgcolor="ddffdd"
| June 5 || vs. Arkansas || Disch-Falk Field || 19–8 || 47–15
|- align="center" bgcolor="ddffdd"
| June 4 || vs.  || Disch-Falk Field || 12–5 || 48–15
|- align="center" bgcolor="ddffdd"
| June 6 || vs. Arkansas || Disch-Falk Field || 5–2 || 49–15
|-

|- align="center" bgcolor="ffdddd"
| June 12 || vs.  || Swayze Field || 4–6 || 49–16
|- align="center" bgcolor="ddffdd"
| June 12 || vs. Mississippi || Swayze Field || 3–1 || 50–16
|- align="center" bgcolor="ddffdd"
| June 13 || vs. Mississippi || Swayze Field || 6–4 || 51–16
|-

|- align="center" bgcolor="ddffdd"
| June 18 || vs. Baylor || Rosenblatt Stadium || 5–1 || 52–16
|- align="center" bgcolor="ddffdd"
| June 20 || vs.  || Rosenblatt Stadium || 5–0 || 53–16
|- align="center" bgcolor="ddffdd"
| June 22 || vs. Baylor || Rosenblatt Stadium || 4–3 || 54–16
|- align="center" bgcolor="ddffdd"
| June 25 || vs. Florida || Rosenblatt Stadium || 4–2 || 55–16
|- align="center" bgcolor="ddffdd"
| June 26 || vs. Florida || Rosenblatt Stadium || 6–2 || 56–16
|-

Awards and honors 
Adrian Alaniz
 Freshman All-America
 All-Big 12 Honorable Mention

Randy Boone
 All-Big 12 Honorable Mention

J. B. Cox
 All-America First Team
 College World Series All-Tournament Team
 All-Big 12 First Team

Will Crouch
 College World Series All-Tournament Team

Seth Johnston
 All-America First Team
 College World Series All-Tournament Team
 All-Big 12 First Team

Carson Kainer
 All-Big 12 Honorable Mention

Kenn Kasparek
 Freshman All-America

David Maroul
 College World Series Most Outstanding Player
 All-Big 12 Honorable Mention

Kyle McCulloch
 College World Series All-Tournament Team
 All-Big 12 First Team

Nick Peoples
 All-Big 12 Honorable Mention

Clayton Stewart
 All-Big 12 Honorable Mention

Drew Stubbs
 All-America Third Team
 All-Big 12 First Team

Taylor Teagarden
 College World Series All-Tournament Team
 All-Big 12 First Team

Clay Van Hook
 All-Big 12 Second Team

Chance Wheeless
 All-Big 12 Honorable Mention

Longhorns in the 2005 MLB Draft 
The following members of the Texas Longhorns baseball program were drafted in the 2005 Major League Baseball Draft.

Rankings

References 

Texas Longhorns
Texas Longhorns baseball seasons
NCAA Division I Baseball Championship seasons
College World Series seasons
Texas